is a Japanese track and road cyclist, who currently rides for UCI Continental team .

Major results

Track

2015
 1st  Points race, UCI Junior World Championships
2016
 1st  Points race, Asian Junior Championships 
2017
 National Championships
1st  Team pursuit (with Hiroto Harai, Yuto Takahashi & Riku Hashimoto)
1st  Points race
 UCI World Cup
2nd Team pursuit, Santiago
2018
 1st  Team pursuit, Asian Championships (with Ryo Chikatani, Shogo Ichimaru & Keitaro Sawada)
 National Championships
2nd Team pursuit
3rd Points race
 Asian Games
3rd  Madison (with Eiya Hashimoto)
3rd  Team pursuit
2019
 National Championships
1st  Team pursuit
2nd Madison (with Ryo Chikatani)
2nd Points race
2020
 1st  Team pursuit, Asian Championships (with Kazushige Kuboki, Ryo Chikatani, Keitaro Sawada & Eiya Hashimoto)
2021
 National Championships
1st  Team pursuit
1st  Individual pursuit
1st  Points race
1st  Scratch
1st  Elimination race
1st  Madison (with Tetsuo Yamamoto)
2nd Omnium
 UCI Nations Cup, Hong Kong
3rd Madison (with Eiya Hashimoto)
3rd Team pursuit
2022
 Asian Championships
1st  Madison (with Kazushige Kuboki)
1st  Omnium
1st  Team pursuit
 National Championships
1st  Madison (with Kazushige Kuboki)
1st  Team pursuit
2nd Individual pursuit
2nd Points race
2nd Omnium
2nd Elimination race
3rd Scratch
 2nd Madison (with Kazushige Kuboki), UCI Nations Cup, Glasgow

Road
2019
 National Under-23 Road Championships
1st  Time trial
3rd Road race
 6th Oita Urban Classic
2022
 Tour de Hokkaido
1st  Points classification
1st Stage 1 & 3

References

External links

1998 births
Living people
Japanese track cyclists
Japanese male cyclists
People from Ukiha, Fukuoka
Cyclists at the 2018 Asian Games
Asian Games medalists in cycling
Medalists at the 2018 Asian Games
Asian Games bronze medalists for Japan
20th-century Japanese people
21st-century Japanese people